Cackalacky is a mildly spiced sweet potato-based table condiment from Pittsboro, North Carolina, U.S.

See also 
Hot sauce

References
http://www.bonappetit.com/blogsandforums/blogs/bafoodist/2008/09/americas-foodiest-small-town-p.html  (See "Chapel Hill's answer to Tabasco")
https://web.archive.org/web/20061018144142/http://www.foodnetwork.com/food/show_sp/episode/0,1976,FOOD_9994_37278,00.html
http://www.washingtonpost.com/wp-dyn/content/article/2005/07/29/AR2005072902133_pf.html
http://www.lynnseldon.com/article596.html (See "The Un-Ketchup" Excerpted from Our State Magazine)
https://web.archive.org/web/20071010060932/http://www.specialtyfood.com/do/news/ViewSpecialtyFoodNewsArticle?id=20677
http://www.hotsauceblog.com/hotsaucearchives/cackalacky-declared-%e2%80%9cthe-un-hot-sauce%e2%80%9d/
https://web.archive.org/web/20071021210419/http://www.specialtyfood.com/do/news/ViewSpecialtyFoodNewsArticle?id=20186
https://web.archive.org/web/20060811222636/http://www.miamisunpost.com/archives/2006/06-29-06/2006Bestof/best_of_dining.htm
https://web.archive.org/web/20060717181014/http://www.bbqblog.com/podcasts/ (See "Cackalacky" Podcast)
https://web.archive.org/web/20060825022322/http://www.ncagr.com/ncproducts/ShowSite.asp?ID=1650
http://www.hotsauceblog.com/hotsaucearchives/cackalacky-gear-merchandising-program-a-success/
http://www.capecodbbq.com/cackalacky.htm

External links
 

Brand name condiments